Susanna Marie Cork (born 18 February 1989), better known as SuRie, is an English singer and  songwriter. She was born in Harlow, Essex, and raised in Bishop's Stortford, Hertfordshire.

Early life and career
SuRie was born Susanna Marie Cork to Andrew Cork and Julia (née Kornberg). Her maternal grandfather, Sir Hans Kornberg, is a German-born British-American biochemist, whose own parents were murdered in the Holocaust. Her stage name SuRie is a combination of first names Susanna Marie. SuRie attended Hills Road Sixth Form College and later graduated from the Royal Academy of Music. Initially trained classically, she can play piano and oboe. She also trained as a vocalist. She started writing at 12-years-old. She has had residencies in Jazz lounges in London. Her younger brother is singer-songwriter Benedict Cork.

She performed in front of the former Prince of Wales as a child soloist and appeared in different British venues such as The Royal Albert Hall and St. Paul's Cathedral and at venues all around the world, including St. Mark's Basilica in Venice.

Eurovision Song Contest 2018

In January 2018, SuRie was confirmed as one of six artists competing in Eurovision: You Decide, the British national selection show for the Eurovision Song Contest 2018. On 7 February 2018, she won the show with the song "Storm", written and composed by Nicole Blair, Gil Lewis, and Sean Hargreaves, and represented the United Kingdom in the Eurovision Song Contest 2018 in Lisbon.

She has a previous experience in the contest, as a backing vocalist and dancer for Loïc Nottet who represented Belgium in Eurovision 2015 in Vienna, Austria with "Rhythm Inside" and she also appeared as a musical director for Blanche’s "City Lights" in Kyiv, Ukraine in Eurovision 2017.

As the United Kingdom is a member of the "Big Five", SuRie automatically qualified to the grand final of the contest, which took place on 12 May 2018 in Lisbon after Salvador Sobral's win in 2017.

SuRie's performance in the final was disrupted by Dr ACactivism who grabbed her microphone and shouted "Modern nazis of the UK media, we demand freedom, war is not peace." She was able to complete her performance, and the broadcast cut to an unscheduled interview in the green room following the song. As a result, SuRie was given permission to perform again after the final performance, but she subsequently declined to do so saying she was proud of her one performance.

Discography

Studio albums

Extended plays

Singles

References

External links

1989 births
Living people
English people of German-Jewish descent
English women pop singers
Eurovision Song Contest entrants for the United Kingdom
Eurovision Song Contest entrants of 2018
Alumni of the Royal Academy of Music
People from Harlow
People from Bishop's Stortford
21st-century English women singers
21st-century English singers